Silent Hill is a survival horror video game franchise created by Team Silent and published by Konami and Konami Digital Entertainment. As well as the main video game series, numerous types of accompanying merchandise have been released.

Video games

Main series

Spin-offs and compilations

Films

Other media

Soundtracks

References 

Media
Silent Hill
Silent Hill